Jasmine is an open-source testing framework for JavaScript. It aims to run on any JavaScript-enabled platform, to not intrude on the application nor the IDE, and to have easy-to-read syntax. It is heavily influenced by other unit testing frameworks, such as ScrewUnit, JSSpec, JSpec, and RSpec.

History
The developers at Pivotal Labs for Jasmine previously developed a similar unit testing framework called JsUnit before active development of Jasmine.

Features 
 Supports asynchronous testing.
 Makes use of 'spies' for implementing test doubles.
 Supports testing of front-end code through a front-end extension of Jasmine called Jasmine-jQuery.

Usage 

Jasmine aims to be easy to read. A simple hello world test looks like the code below, where describe() describes a suite of tests and it() is an individual test specification. The name "it()" follows the idea of behavior-driven development and serves as the first word in the test name, which should be a complete sentence. Usage follows syntax similar to that of RSpec.

The code below tests this function 
function helloWorld() {
  return 'Hello world!';
}
and verifies that its output is indeed the text "Hello world!".

describe('Hello world', function() {
  it('says hello', function() {
    expect(helloWorld()).toEqual('Hello world!');
  });
});

Jasmine provides a rich set of built-in matchers. In the above example, toEqual checks the equality between the value returned from the helloWorld() function and the 'Hello world!' string. This is the same as assertions used in other testing frameworks. Jasmine matchers return a Boolean value: true if the expectation is matched (a way to indicate that the test has passed) or false if the expectation does not match. A good practice is to put a single expectation in an individual it() test specification.

Other built-in matchers include toBe, toBeTruthy, toBeFalsy, toContain, toBeDefined, toBeUndefined, toBeNull, toBeNaN, toBeGreaterThan, toBeLessThan, toBeCloseTo. The identity matcher toBe checks if two things are the same object. The condition matchers toBeTruthy, toBeFalsy evaluate if something is true or false and toBeDefined, toBeUndefined check if something is defined or undefined. As the name suggests toBeNull checks if something is null and toBeNaN checks if something is not a number (NaN). Precision matcher toBeCloseTo accepts two parameters and checks if a number is close to the first parameter, given a certain amount of decimal precision as indicated by the second parameter. Matcher toContain is used to verify that an element, object or sub-string is contained in an array, list or string.

The special built-in matcher toThrow is used to verify that an exception has been thrown. The code below verifies that "Some exception" is thrown.

describe('Expect to throw an exception', function() {
  it('throws some exception', function() {
    expect( function(){ throw('Some exception'); }).toThrow('Some exception');
  });
});

Jasmine has a number of other features, such as custom matchers, spies, and support for asynchronous specifications.

Jasmine test runners 
Jasmine comes with an inbuilt test runner. Jasmine tests can run browser tests by including a simple SpecRunner.html file or by using it as a command line test runner supported for various languages like Nodejs, Python, Ruby, or (old way) by using Karma, a simple JavaScript test runner tool.

Comparison between Jasmine and Mocha 
Mocha is another popular Javascript testing framework. The comparison between Jasmine and Mocha is given in the table below.

Benefits 
 The aim of Jasmine is to be browser, framework, platform and language independent.
 Besides behavior-driven development, Jasmine also supports test driven development.

See also 
 List of JavaScript libraries
 List of unit testing frameworks
 Mocha (JavaScript framework)
 QUnit
JavaScript framework
JavaScript library

References

External links 

 Jasmine website
 Jasmine on GitHub
 JSSpec
 JSpec
 ScrewUnit

JavaScript programming tools
Unit testing frameworks
Software using the MIT license
Free software programmed in JavaScript